TypeCon is an annual convention presented by the Society of Typographic Aficionados. The 10th iteration of this event, themed “Punkt” was held at the Hyatt Regency in Buffalo, New York between July 15–20, 2008. The conference offered workshops and lectures covering topics such as letterpress, typography, history, and print. The convention was sponsored by the Western New York Book Arts Collaborative,  the Albright-Knox Art Gallery, and the University at Buffalo, as well as other local schools and non-profit organizations.

Presenters included Stefan Sagmeister and Erik Spiekermann.

References 
 TypeCon Official conference site
 Society of Typographic Aficionados (SOTA) Parent organization site

Typography